Pseudolatirus is a genus of sea snails, marine gastropod mollusks in the family Fasciolariidae, the spindle snails, the tulip snails and their allies.

Species
Species within the genus Pseudolatirus include:
 Pseudolatirus clausicaudatus (Hinds, 1844)
 Pseudolatirus discrepans Kuroda & Habe, 1961
 Pseudolatirus kuroseanus (Okutani, 1975)
 Pseudolatirus leucostriatus Kosuge, 1979
 Pseudolatirus pallidus Kuroda & Habe, 1961
 Pseudolatirus pfeifferi (Philippi, 1846)
† Pseudolatirus bilineatus (Hörnes, 1853)

Synonym 
 Pseudolatirus kurodai Okutani & Sakurai, 1964: synonym of Fusolatirus kurodai (Okutani & Sakurai, 1964)

References

Fasciolariidae